Farley is a hamlet and civil parish in the Staffordshire Moorlands district, in the English county of Staffordshire. It is near to the villages of Alton and Oakamoor.

Alton Towers theme park is within the parish boundary.

To the west of the hamlet stands the privately owned 17th century Farley Hall, which has been both a youth hostel and the residence of Anthony Bamford, Managing Director of JCB.

See also
Listed buildings in Farley, Staffordshire

References

Villages in Staffordshire
Civil parishes in Staffordshire
Towns and villages of the Peak District
Staffordshire Moorlands